Quintiliani  is a station on Line B of the Rome Metro. It is located on Via della Pietra Sanguigna and takes its name from the ancient Casale dei Quintiliani, which stood near the station. Other nearby streets are Via delle Cave di Pietralata and Via del Casale Quintiliani. Nearby is the Ospedale Sandro Pertini.

History
Prior to opening, the station was going to be called Pietralata (with the present Pietralata station to be called Feronia), but it was decided that this could cause confusion and in 1990 it was decided to change the station's name to its present one. It now stands in open countryside but was planned to serve the new Sistema Direzionale Orientale (SDO), which was to be sited in precisely the same area, with an interchange onto a planned 'line D' from Monte Sacro, as yet still unbuilt.
Though Line B itself opened in 1990, Quintiliani was a de facto ghost station for 13 years since trains did never stop there. Only on 23 June 2003 the station was opened to regular service when the SDO project was dismissed.

References

External links

Rome Metro Line B stations
Railway stations opened in 2003
2003 establishments in Italy
Rome Q. XXI Pietralata
Railway stations in Italy opened in the 21st century